Andrianovka , rural localities and rivers in Russia, may refer to:

 Localities
 Andrianovka, Bashkortostan, a village
 Andrianovka, Kamchatka Krai, a village
 Andrianovka, Medvensky District, Kursk Oblast, a village
 Andrianovka, Oktyabrsky District, Kursk Oblast, a village
 Andrianovka, Nizhny Novgorod Oblast, a settlement
 Andrianovka, Ryazan Oblast, a village
 Andrianovka, Tambov Oblast, a village
 Andrianovka, Voronezh Oblast, a khutor

 Rivers
 Andrianovka (Northern Dvina), a tributary of the Northern Dvina, Arkhangelsk Oblast
 Andrianovka (Kamchatka), a left tributary of the Kamchatka River, Kamchatka Krai

 See also
 Andrianov